Stagira-Akanthos is a former municipality in Chalkidiki, Greece. Since the 2011 local government reform it is part of the municipality Aristotelis, of which it is a municipal unit. Population 8,705 (2011). The seat of the former municipality was in Ierissos, which is also the seat of the municipality Aristotelis. The land area of the municipal unit is 253.373 km². It lies north of the autonomous area of Mount Athos. The Greek philosopher Aristotle was born in the ancient city of Stageira, in the northwest part of the municipal unit.

Subdivisions
The municipal unit Stagira-Akanthos is subdivided into the following communities:
Ammouliani
Ierissos
Nea Roda
Olympiada
Ouranoupoli
Stagira
Stratoniki
Stratoni

See also
Strymonian Gulf

References

External links

Official website 

Populated places in Chalkidiki